= Glenda Swanson Lyle =

American politician

Member of the Colorado House of Representatives
- In office 1993–1997

Personal details
- Born: Knoxville, Tennessee, United States
- Party: Democratic
- Profession: Urban planning firm owner

Glenda Swanson Lyle is a former state legislator in Colorado. She represented the Democratic Party in the Colorado House of Representatives from 1993 to 1997. She has lived in Denver.

She was born in Knoxville, Tennessee. She served in the Colorado House of Representatives from 1992 to 1996. She was Minority Whip in 1995 and 1996.

Lyle owned an urban planning firm, was a founder of Colorado Black Women for Political Action, and was a board member of the Inner City Development Corporation.
